Scopula lactaria is a moth of the family Geometridae. It was described by Francis Walker in 1861. It is found in Africa south of the Sahara and on some islands of the Indian Ocean (Sokotra and Réunion). It can be distinguished from Scopula minorata only by genitalia examination.

Subspecies
Scopula lactaria lactaria
Scopula lactaria gaboosi Hausmann, 1998

References

lactaria
Moths described in 1861
Moths of the Comoros
Moths of Africa
Moths of Madagascar
Moths of Réunion